BC Zaporizhya is a Ukrainian professional basketball club, based in Zaporizhia. The club was previously known as BC Ferro-ZNTU. The team played in Ukrainian SL Favorit Sport.

Logos

Trophies
Ukrainian Cup: 2 
2010, 2013

Season by season

Players

Current squad

Notable players
  Malique Trent 1 season: 2018–19
  Randy Culpepper 2 seasons: 2011–13
  R. T. Guinn 2 seasons: 2011–13
  Steven Burtt 1 season: 2010
  Gjorgji Čekovski 1 season: 2009

References

External links
Official Website 
Eurobasket.com BC Zaporizhya Page

Basketball teams in Ukraine
Sport in Zaporizhzhia
Basketball teams established in 1972
1972 establishments in Ukraine